Stadion Bistritsa is a multi-purpose stadium in Bistritsa, Sofia, Bulgaria.  It is currently used for football matches and is the home ground of the local football clubs Vitosha Bistritsa, CSKA 1948 and formerly Septemvri Sofia. The stadium has a seating capacity of 2,500 spectators.

History
Following the team's promotion to the Bulgarian First League, the stadium was reconstructed in order to acquire permissions from the Bulgarian Football Union's licensing committee to stage matches for the upcoming season. In 2017 Septemvri Sofia announced that they will move to the stadium until their new ground is built.

References

Football venues in Bulgaria
Buildings and structures in Sofia